Brada is an unincorporated community in Saskatchewan, located just outside the eastern city limits of North Battleford on Yellowhead Highway 16. It consists of a few homes and industrial businesses.

North Battleford No. 437, Saskatchewan
Unincorporated communities in Saskatchewan
Division No. 16, Saskatchewan